The Battle of Gatae was an engagement fought in roughly 103 AD during the Roman Emperor Trajan's war with the kingdom of Dacia.

There is no serious historical evidence giving an exact place or time to the battle, nor any troop positions, numerical statistics, casualties, or much of anything of that nature. It is not even fully understood if the battle was in of itself a major engagement or merely a small battle or even a large skirmish. Dio Cassius gives a minor mention of the battle, but it is a mere mention.

It is understood that this battle did, however, somehow break the back of the Dacian army and allow the Roman Legions to make serious tactical headway. However, Decebalus, king of Dacia, managed to secure a peace before the capital of Sarmizegetusa was captured.

See also 
 Trajan's Dacian Wars
 Dacian warfare

Notes

Further reading 

 103: 103 Deaths, Sextus Julius Frontinus, List of State Leaders in 103, Battle of Gatae, 103 Ad

Gatae
Gatae
103
Gatae